The 2012 Dahsyatnya Awards was an awards show for Indonesian musicians. It was the fourth annual show. The show was held on January 25, 2012, at the Jakarta International Expo in Kemayoran, Central Jakarta. The awards show was hosted by Raffi Ahmad, Olga Syahputra, Olla Ramlan, Jessica Iskandar, Ayu Ting Ting, Boy William and Pak Tarno. The awards ceremonies will held theme for "Sebarkan Kedahsyatan Cintamu".

Mulan Jameela led the nominations with three categories, followed by Agnes Monica, Indah Dewi Pertiwi, Syahrini, Afgan, RAN, etc. with two nominations. Gigi was the biggest winner of the night, taking home two awards for Outstanding Legend and Outstanding Video Clip for "Bye Bye".

Winners and nominees
Winners are listed first and highlighted on boldface.

SMS

Jury

References

2012 music awards
Dahsyatnya Awards
Indonesian music awards